, also known by the stage name , was a Japanese comedian, singer, and voice actor.

Early life 
Saitō was born in Kanagawa Prefecture to Mitsuru and Misao Saitō on 24 September 1976. He had a younger brother named Masashi and graduated from Nihon University's College of Art. As a teenager, he was an active Johnny's member.

Career
In 1999, Saitō formed a comedy duo called Abare Nunchaku with fellow up-and-coming comedian Kosuke Takeuchi. The team broke up in 2005, but they reunited in 2006 on the show Enta no kami-sama, where Saitō appeared for the first time as Sukeban Kyoko, a delinquent schoolgirl always seen carrying shinai bamboo sword. He appeared as Sukeban on Quiz $ Millionaire in 2007, where he answered incorrectly in the final round, decreasing his earnings from ¥10,000,000 to ¥1,000,000.

He made his musical debut in 2006 with the release of the single Geki Maji Mukatsuku. By the time of his death, he had released seven albums: Gekimajimukatsuku, 1000% SO Zakune?, Christmaster, Doonacchattendayo, Kaisou Rasputin, Sakura Revolution, and Aserunda Joshi Ha Itsumo Medatanai K. He also sang with the band Bijomen Z, a musical group where all its members dressed as women.

As a voice actor, Saitō starred in shows such as Detective Conan and Inazuma Eleven, sometimes using the stage name Hiromi Ueda.  He published his first book, 桜塚やっくんの都市伝説工場 (Cleavage or, literally, Urban Legend Factory), in 2008.

Controversy
In 2011, the Tokyo Metropolitan Police Department contacted Saitō regarding the alleged rape of a drunk college student in 2010. He denied the accusations. It was later reported that a settlement had been reached between Saitō and the woman.

Death 
Saitō was killed in a traffic accident on October 5, 2013, aged 37, on the Chugoku Expressway in Mine, Yamaguchi, while en route to a concert in Kumamoto Prefecture. He was hit by another car and killed when exiting his car after colliding with the median.

Discography

Filmography

Dubbing 
The Cabin in the Woods (Marty Mikalski (Fran Kranz))

References

External links 

 Official blog 
 Agency profile (Archived) 

1976 births
2013 deaths
Japanese comedians
Japanese male voice actors
Male voice actors from Kumamoto Prefecture
Road incident deaths in Japan
Male-to-female cross-dressers
20th-century Japanese musicians
20th-century Japanese male singers
20th-century Japanese singers